Weruweru Girls Secondary School (formerly known as Assumpta College) is a government secondary school in Moshi, Tanzania.

History
The school was established in September 1963 as Assumpta College and was officially inaugurated by Julius Nyerere, Tanganyika's first president on 22 October 1963. In 1970, the school was renamed to its present name after it was handed over to the government.

Headmistresses
 Maria Kamm (1970–1992)
 Flaviana Msuya (1993–2001)
 Anna Devota Sambaya (2001–2009)
 Rosalia Frimin (2009-Present)

Notable alumni
 Asha-Rose Migiro, former Deputy Secretary-General of the United Nations
 Mary Nagu, Tanzanian politician
 Anne Malecela, Member of Parliament for Same East constituency
 Mwele Ntuli Malecela, former Director General of the National Institute for Medical Research (NIMR) in Tanzania, former Director in the Office of Africa Regional Director at the World Health Organisation, Director Department of Control of Neglected Tropical Diseases at World Health Organization headquarters (till death 10 February 2022).
 Irene Tarimo, Researcher, Biologist and Lecturer at OUT
 Rosemary Nyerere, Educator, Member of Parliament
 Helen Kijo-Bisimba, Former Director of Legal and Human Rights Center
 Julie Makani, Associate Professor and Research Fellow

References

External links
 
 

 
Weruweru Secondary School alumni
Educational institutions established in 1963
1963 establishments in Tanganyika
Girls' schools in Tanzania